Paris Model is a 1953 American comedy drama film directed by Alfred E. Green and starring Marilyn Maxwell, Paulette Goddard, Eva Gabor and Barbara Lawrence. It is an anthology featuring four separate parts, each focused on one of the four actresses. It was distributed by Columbia Pictures. The film's sets were designed by the art director William Glasgow.

Plot
A new dress plays a key role in the lives of four women who are not acquainted with each other. A daring strapless design, "Nude at Midnight," is unveiled in Paris to the delight of socialite Gogo Montaine, who wants to dazzle the Maharajah of Kim-Kepore, her escort that night. She charges its $900 cost to a former lover, Louis-Jean, who turns up later and refuses to pay. The Raj begins paying more attention to the gambling tables, so Gogo uses her dress and charms to get back into Louis-Jean's good graces.

A buyer from New York City has an underling copy the Paris dress's design and quickly manufactures a cheaper version of it. Betty Barnes, a secretary, spends $90 on one to impress her boss, attorney Edgar Blevins, hoping to woo him away from Cora, his wife. Cora eavesdrops on her at the dress shop. While her husband is admiring Betty in it, Cora turns up in exactly the same dress, diverting her husband's wandering eyes.

Marion Parmalee wants a promotion for her husband, whose boss P.J. Sullivan is retiring to Florida with his wife. At the retirement party, wearing a "Nude at Midnight" dress she bought for $59, Marion flirts with P.J., a bed manufacturer. When they get caught atop a bed together, P. J.'s wife instantly names another man at the party as her husband's successor.

In far-off Los Angeles, a 21st-birthday party and a desire for boyfriend Charlie to propose marriage to her motivate Marta Jensen into buying an eye-catching dress, "Nude at Midnight," a copy of which she finds on sale for $19. They have difficult getting a table at Michael Romanoff's popular restaurant, frustrating Charlie until he gets an eyeful of Marta in her gown. At a nearby table, also appreciating her beauty in this dress, sits the Maharajah of Kim-Kepore.

Cast
 Marilyn Maxwell as Marion Parmalee 
 Paulette Goddard as Betty Barnes  
 Eva Gabor as Gogo Montaine  
 Barbara Lawrence as Marta Jensen  
 Cecil Kellaway as Patrick J. 'P.J.' Sullivan  
 Robert Hutton as Charlie Johnson  
 Leif Erickson as Edgar Blevins  
 Tom Conway as Maharajah of Kim-Kepore  
 Michael Romanoff as Prince Romanoff 
 Florence Bates as Mrs. Nora Sullivan
 El Brendel as Papa Jensen
 Laurette Luez as Lisa Jones 
 Robert Bice as Jack Parmalee
 Aram Katcher as Louis-Jean Vacheron  
 Gloria Christian as Cora Blevins   
 Byron Foulger as Ernest Boggs
 Bibs Borman as Berta Courtallez
 Renny McEvoy as 	Johnny Granville 
 Eugene Borden as	Armand - Headwaiter
 Gloria Pall as 	Credits Girl 
 Diana Darrin as Gambling Patron

References

Bibliography
 Pamela Robertson Wojcik. New Constellations: Movie Stars of the 1960s. Rutgers University Press, 2012.

External links
 

1953 films
1953 comedy-drama films
American comedy-drama films
Films directed by Alfred E. Green
Films scored by Albert Glasser
Columbia Pictures films
American black-and-white films
1950s English-language films
1950s American films